S96 may refer to:
 S96 (New York City bus) serving Staten Island
 S96, a non-geographic postcode in Sheffield, England